SIM University (UniSIM) was a private university in Singapore between 2005 and 2017. The university was established and managed under the Singapore Institute of Management (SIM). It was the only private university in Singapore after Nanyang University. The university practiced an open-door academic policy towards working adults and offered only part-time programmes. 
Between 2010 and 2017, UniSIM was registered under the Committee for Private Education (CPE).

In 2017, UniSIM was restructured into the sixth autonomous university, Singapore University of Social Sciences (SUSS) and brought under the ambit of the Ministry of Education. Subsequently, SUSS conducted an exercise to issue certificates in SUSS for UniSIM issued certificates. A statement will indicate that these qualifications had been received under the former's name.

History

Open University Degree Programme (1994–2005)

In 1992, SIM was selected by the Ministry of Education (Singapore) (MOE) to run the Open University Degree Programme (OUDP), in collaboration with The Open University, United Kingdom (OUUK).  In 1994, the first batch of SIM OUDP's 900 students studied only among three degree programmes. In 1998, the first graduation ceremony with 334 was graced by former Deputy Prime Minister of Singapore Tony Tan.

In 2002, OUDP attaining accreditation status and was renamed Singapore Institute of Management's Open University Centre (SIM-OUC) as one of SIM's autonomous entity.

Establishment

In 2005, SIM received the mandate from MOE to form SIM University (UniSIM) to forge upgrading opportunities for working adult from diverse academic qualifications and work experiences.

Established on the foundation SIM-OUC, UniSIM took over more than 6,500 students from SIM-OUC studying in over 40 programmes. SIM-OUC students who graduated from 2006 and onwards were given a choice between a UniSIM or OUUK degree.

UniSIM provides an avenue for working adults who have previously missed education opportunities to upgrade their qualifications and skills. The university also provides opportunities for working adult to pursue their passion or chart a different career course. The quality of the programmes is high, flexible and made accessible through e-learning to working adults. Many continuous education courses were made scalable to suit different organisations.

Logo
UniSIM's logo consists of three wave-like strokes.

Wings by Yeo Chee Keong

This sculpture was donated by Yeo Chee Keong and Anthony Teo to UniSIM. Mounted on a soft hue of volga blue Ukrainian igneous granite pedestal, Wings aspire UniSIM graduates to soar.

Restructuring into the Singapore University of Social Sciences
On 12 October 2016, Acting Minister for Education (Higher Education and Skills) and Senior Minister of State for Defence Mr Ong Ye Kung announced that the Government invited UniSIM to become Singapore's 6th autonomous university. Subsequently, on 11 November 2016, the SIM governing council voted in favour to bring the university under the ambit of MOE.

In 2017, UniSIM was restructured into the Singapore University of Social Sciences (SUSS) and became Singapore's sixth autonomous university under the ambit of the Ministry of Education (MOE). It is no longer a member of the Singapore Institute of Management Group (SIM).

UniSIM and SIM GE

The public may view both UniSIM and SIM Global Education (SIM GE) as SIM students, in fact they are both different business units of the SIM Group. UniSIM was a private university which offered government subsidized programmes whereas SIM GE partners with University of London International Programmes, RMIT University etc. to offer their programmes in Singapore.

Admission
The university adopted open-door admission criteria. Criteria to its undergraduate programmes were at least two GCE 'A' level passes or a polytechnic diploma, at least two years' work experience and minimum at 21 years old.

Notable alumni and students
Adrian Tan - Singaporean litigator and president of the Law Society of Singapore.
Aloysius Pang - Singaporean actor, who died on 23 January 2019 due to sustaining serious crush injuries during SAF reservist training in New Zealand.

References

2005 establishments in Singapore
2017 disestablishments in Singapore
Defunct universities in Singapore
Educational institutions established in 2005
Educational institutions disestablished in 2017
Education in Singapore
Singapore Institute of Management
Singapore University of Social Sciences